James Joseph Celestine (born 13 October 1973) is a Bermudian cricketer. He plays as a right-handed batsman and has represented Bermuda at One Day International Cricket.

References

External links

1973 births
Living people
Bermudian cricketers
Bermuda One Day International cricketers
Bermuda Twenty20 International cricketers